The Soufflet Group is a French family-owned business based on collecting and adding value to agricultural raw materials.

The Group is a major player in supplying arable farmers, and in the vine and wine sector. It advises and supplies farmers, vine growers and winemakers. An agricultural and industrial company specialising in the first conversion of cereals, the Soufflet Group operates mainly in the wheat and barley sectors in France, Europe and Asia.

The Soufflet Group also operates in the first conversion of maize, rice and pulses.

Based on solid-state fermentation, since 2008 it has been investing in researching new ways of improving agricultural resources, through its Osiris programme, backed by OSEO, and four regional biotechnology research programmes (PRBR - Programmes de Recherche Biotechnologique Régionaux) backed by the FEDER, the Champagne-Ardenne region, the department of Aube and the town of Nogent-sur-Seine.

Fields of business

The Soufflet Group has nine businesses:

Agriculture
France's top private collector of cereals and oil seeds, Soufflet Agriculture stores and markets farm production, and retails agricultural supplies in France and in five other European countries.

Vine
Soufflet Vigne offers vine growers, wine makers, cooperatives and merchants a range of products and services, together with technical advice.

Trading

The Group's Trading Division, Soufflet Négoce, has 4 trading offices and 4 port silos (in the Atlantic, the Channel and the Black Sea). It specialises in sourcing, transporting and exporting cereals, oilseeds and dairy products.

Milling
With 10 mills in France and Belgium, Moulins Soufflet prepares and markets flours for its different types of customers: traditional bakers, flour-using industries and major retailers.
Moulins Soufflet also owns the Baguépi brand name.

Ingredients
Formulating tailor-made ingredients, AIT Ingredients offers solutions meeting the various problems its industrial customers face, mainly in the breadmaking sector. The company is developing on the European and African markets as well as in Russia, the Middle East and South America.

Malting

Malteries Soufflet is one of the world's main producers of kilned and roasted malt and caramels.

Maize processing
Specializing in the first conversion of maize, Costimex produces and markets world-wide maize hominies, grits, semolina and flour tailored to the various requirements of brewers and snack and breakfast cereal manufacturers.

Rice and pulses
An industrial company specialising in processing and packing rice and pulses, Soufflet Alimentaire, which has three plants in France, including one in partnership – offers more than 120 materials and 2,000 product lines for the industrial, ethnic, catering and retail markets.

Soufflet Alimentaire (the food division) develops as well as markets products that can be microwaved by end-users under its Vivien Paille brand name.

Biotechnology
In Solid State Fermentation (SSF), the Soufflet Group works in the field of biotechnologies applied to innovative biocatalysts from agricultural resources.

Its Caen-based Lyven subsidiary formulates and produces by SSF enzyme solutions for the fruit processing, drinks, bakery, animal feed and biofuel sectors.

History

1900 - Pierre and Lucie Juchat founded a grain business at Nogent-sur-Seine in France's Champagne region.
1927 - Lucie Juchat passed the small business on to her son-in-law Jean Soufflet and daughter Yvonne who developed cereal collection.
1939 - Jean Soufflet built the first grain silo on Quai Sarrail at Nogent-sur-Seine, where the Group is still based.
1946 - the family business became a limited liability company under the name Etablissements J. Soufflet.
1947 - farming modernised with the Marshall plan and the construction of Europe took shape.
1950 - Jean Soufflet began the first cereal exports and bought the big Nogent-sur-Seine malt plant in 1953.
1957 - After his father died, Michel Soufflet ran the business.
1958 - The business became a joint stock company of 500,000 francs capital and was employing some twenty people.
1960s - Michel Soufflet improved cereal collection by creating a service to uplift and transport grain from field to silo.
1965 - Ets. J. Soufflet had thirty four employees, including one at the Pont-sur-Seine silo and one at Anglure.
1966 - The first port silo was built at Rouen.
1970 - The Group built a new malt plant at Nogent-sur-Seine (30,000 tonne capacity) and opened its first foreign subsidiary in 1974, in Great Britain.
1978 - The Group, which had become the top private collector of cereals in France, went into milling by buying the first mill in France's Aube.
1981 - Jean-Michel Soufflet began his career in the Group.
1982 - Other sectors added such as plant baking, maize processing
1989 - Rice and pulses added.
1989 - The Group consolidated its milling business, taking over Cérès, the biggest miller in Belgium.
1994 - Soufflet bought the Pantin Group, consisting on Grands Moulins of Pantin and Corbeil, the Franco-Belgian malt plants and the cereal trader Cerapro.
1998 - The Group expanded abroad, investing in particular in Central and Eastern European countries.
2001 (Jan) - Jean-Michel Soufflet was appointed Chairman of the Executive Board; Michel Soufflet became Chairman of the Supervisory Board.
2002 (Apr) - The malting division expanded with the purchase of Tchécomalt and new companies set up in the Community of Independent States - Russia, Kazakhstan and Ukraine (2004)
2003 - The Ingredients Division was created, following the purchase of Lyven.
2005 - Moulins Soufflet bought the Dadou and Thor mills, then the Strasbourg mill in 2009, and Ozon mill in 2010.
2008 - Marked by the official launch of the Osiris biotechnology innovation programme.
2010 - Malting Division inaugurated two new plants, in Romania and at Nogent-sur-Seine.
2011 (1 Jul) - Soufflet Agriculture took over Etablissements Maison Daughter (Indre) and AGIR (Yonne).
2011 - Soufflet Malting took two malt plants over from Kamenitza, a subsidiary of the Starbev Group in Bulgaria, then the German maltster Durst Malz.

References

Agriculture companies of France
Food and drink companies established in 1900
French companies established in 1900
Grain companies
Companies based in Grand Est